The Syracuse State School was a residential facility in Syracuse, New York for mentally disabled children and adults.  Founded in 1851 in Albany, New York as the New York State Asylum for Idiots, its first director was Hervey B. Wilbur, a student of Edward Seguin (another of Seguin's students was Maria Montessori). In 1855, the facility moved to a new building in Syracuse where it was known as the New York Asylum for Idiots or the State Idiot Asylum. Over the next hundred years the institution went through several name changes, including the Syracuse State Institution for Feeble-Minded Children, the Syracuse State School for Mental Defectives, and finally the Syracuse State School. In the early 90s, The Syracuse State School started to have a dwindling population. The facility was subsequently shut down June 17 of 1998, as they stopped receiving new patients and only had six.

Following eight years of abandonment, In October 2006 the school was placed up for auction and sold for 2.2 Million to Syracuse Resort Development, a group of investors on long island. These investors wanted to make it a vacation resort. But the state Empire State Development Corporation soon expressed worry that the Purchase of the property was fraudulent. One of the investors, Moussa Yeroushalmi, had been sued by the U.S. Securities and Exchange Commission in 2004 over allegations that he defrauded investors. The worries soon came true. SRD paid no taxes on the property and continuously contested the 585,000 square-foot building's tax assessment. Proposals by SRD, such as a resort for disabled people and a "green" business park, never materialized.

Syracuse Resort, an affiliate of SRD and a minority owner of the former developmental center, filed for bankruptcy in December 2010. SRD, which owned 92.5% of the property, followed suit in April 2011. Both actions were filed to prevent the city from seizing the property for back taxes.

The Property was sold to a "Syracuse Center LLC" in 2013. Syracuse Center LLC acquired the Property in a bankruptcy auction for $2.1 million in 2013. It has not paid a dime in property taxes since January 2016, according to the city Department of Finance. This company was once thought to be a portion of a Jewish trade school based out of California, But it turns out the center is actually owned by a company that Kazakhstan officials allege to be a shell corporation formed to hide tens of millions of dollars in stolen money according to local media syracuse.com. Weirdly enough the actions of the man who submitted the bid for Syracuse Center at an auction in April 2013 at the Onondaga County Courthouse, after submitting the winning bid of $2.1 million, the man ran from reporters, refusing to identify himself and even hiding his face with an iPad. A McClatchy DC story in 2017 identified the mysterious man as New York developer Felix Sater, who it said was a two-time ex-con turned government informant and a one-time adviser to the then-President Donald Trump.

In the summer of 2019 the property was seized by the city as they had not paid any taxes since 2016. The Property was listed for auction on September 4, 2020.

References

Sources
 James Thornton Correspondence finding aid
 New York State Asylum for Idiots at rootsweb.com
 "A Short History of Hospitals in Syracuse", Upstate Medical University Health Sciences Library, Historical Collections
Abandoned Online
New York, Legislature, Assembly, New York State Legislature Assembly. Documents of the Assembly of the State of New York. 1888. Vol. 6.
Four years later, former Syracuse Developmental Center may get another chance to develop
Syracuse Developmental Center Assorted Estrayed Institutional Records
The massive Developmental Center on Syracuse’s West Side is up for sale
Meet the ex-con who ties himself to Trump

Hospital buildings completed in 1855
Defunct schools in New York (state)
Buildings and structures in Syracuse, New York
Psychiatric hospitals in New York (state)
Intellectual disability hospitals
Education in Syracuse, New York
Demolished buildings and structures in New York (state)
Buildings and structures demolished in the 1970s